Tonight the Monkeys Die: Low Remixed is a remix album of the song "Monkey" from Low's 2005 album The Great Destroyer.

Track listing
All songs written by Mimi Parker, Zak Sally, and Alan Sparhawk
"Monkey" – 4:19
"Monkey" (Fog Remix) – 4:43
"Monkey" (Crew Jones Remix) – 2:57
"Monkey" (Stephin Merritt Remix) – 3:54
"Monkey" (Bob Mould Remix) – 7:19
"Monkey" (The Count Remix) – 4:17
"Monkey" QuickTime music video, directed by Harder/Fuller Films

Personnel
Mimi Parker – drums, backing vocals
Zak Sally – bass guitar
Alan Sparhawk – guitar, vocals

Release history

External links

2005 EPs
Albums produced by Bob Mould
Low (band) EPs
2005 remix albums
Remix EPs
Albums produced by Dave Fridmann
Low (band) remix albums